The prime minister of Tanzania is the head in the National Assembly of the United Republic of Tanzania. The position is subordinated to the president, who is the actual head of government.

The functions and powers of the prime minister are described in the Constitution of Tanzania:

The incumbent prime minister, Kassim Majaliwa was appointed by the president the late John Magufuli. He took the office on 20 November 2015.

List

See also
Tanzania
Politics of Tanzania
List of governors of Tanganyika
President of Tanzania
List of heads of state of Tanzania
List of prime ministers of Tanzania
List of sultans of Zanzibar
President of Zanzibar
List of heads of government of Zanzibar
Lists of incumbents

References

External links
 

 
1972 establishments in Tanzania

